Hardo Saharan, is a town and Union Council in Wazirabad Tehsil, Gujranwala District, Punjab, Pakistan. National Assembly constituency of Hardo Saharan is NA79 (WAZIRABAD) and Punjab Assembly PP52 (ALIPURCHATHA).Union Council no. of Hardo Saharan is 17.

Notable residents

 

 Sardar Fateh Singh Chatha, Landlord, Migrated to Haryana State of India in 1947 A.D.

 Hazrat Muhammad Shareef Vaseer, Renowned Saint, Religious Scholar, Poet, Teacher and Philanthropist.

 Muhammad Arif Saharni, Renowned Short Story Writer, Poet, Teacher and Author of Number of Books. Later, shifted to Kolo Tarrar District Hafizabad.

 Dr. Sikander Chatha, Doctor of Medicine, USA.

 Dr. Shaukat Mahmood Gondal, Doctor of Veterinary Medicine, Former District Officer Veterinary, Gujranwala.

 Muhammad Maalik Chatha, Educationist, Former Headmaster Govt. High School, Hardo Saharan.

 Prof. Dr. Muhammad Yousof Vaseer, Professor and Principal of Saharan School and College.

 Rana Ehsan Ul Haq Khan, Social Welfare Activist, Marketing Expert and VLogger.

See also

 Gujranwala
 Wazirabad

References

Cities and towns in Gujranwala District
Populated places in Wazirabad Tehsil
Union councils of Wazirabad Tehsil